Atlético Clube da Malveira is a Portuguese football club located in Mafra, Portugal, that currently plays in the AF Lisboa 1st Division, in the fifth tier.

History
AC da Malveira was formed in 1940 from the merger of Grupo Desportivo Recreativo Os Malveirenses and Orquestra Típica da Malveira.

For the 2022-23 season, Belenenses SAD who will play in the second tier Liga Portugal 2 after being relegated from the top tier Primeira Liga, reached an agreement to use Malveira's Estádio das Seixas as their home ground.

References

Football clubs in Portugal
Association football clubs established in 1940